, there were about 2,900 electric vehicles (including plug-in hybrid vehicles) in Montana, equivalent to 0.18% of all light-duty vehicles in the state.

Government
, the state government charges the same annual registration fees for gasoline-powered and electric vehicles.

Charging stations
, there were 80 public charging stations in Montana.

The Infrastructure Investment and Jobs Act, signed into law in November 2021, allocates  to charging stations in Montana.

, the state government plans to build "alternative fuel corridors", with charging stations located at least every , along I-15, I-90, I-94, US-2, and US-93.

By region

Missoula
The Missoula and Missoula County governments have requested that the state government designate US-12, MT-83, and MT-200 as alternative fuel corridors, in addition to the existing designated highways.

References

Montana
Road transportation in Montana